= Ghogare =

Village in Maharashtra

- Village
- Interactive map of Ghogare
- Coordinates: 17°50′45″N 73°28′04″E
- Country: India
- State: Maharashtra

Ghogare is a small village in Ratnagiri district, Maharashtra state in Western India. The 2011 Census of India recorded a total of 431 residents in the village. Ghogare's geographical area is approximately 573 hectares (1,420 acres).
